El Jaleo is a large painting by John Singer Sargent, depicting a Spanish Romani dancer performing to the accompaniment of musicians. Painted in 1882, it currently hangs in the Isabella Stewart Gardner Museum in Boston.

Background
The painting was inspired by a five-month trip Sargent made through Spain and North Africa in 1879, which also yielded a smaller oil painting, The Spanish Dance (Hispanic Society of America). Chronologically and thematically, the painting is related to a series of works Sargent painted during a subsequent stay in Venice; these, too, include dramatic light effects, exotic models, and restrained coloring. Impressed by the costumes and theatrical manner of Romani dance, the artist returned to Paris and began work on a large canvas whose scale suggested a performing stage. The name El Jaleo refers to both the broad meaning of jaleo, a ruckus, as well as the specific dance known as jaleo de jerez.

Sargent planned the composition of El Jaleo for at least a year. The painting was preceded by a series of preliminary studies, focusing particularly on the dancer's stylized posture. The result of thorough preparation, El Jaleo is characterized by an assured and rapid handling, and may have been completed in no more than a few days.

Description

At odds with the academic practice of carefully modulated tones, Sargent dramatized the contrast between rich blacks and the shining white skirt of the dancer, caught in the strong footlights and painted briskly so as to suggest movement. The lighting also creates long and eerie shadows on the rear wall that comprises nearly half the painting.

The female dancer, leaning asymmetrically, is placed to imply forward motion, from left to right across the canvas. She is wearing a large, embroidered shawl wrapped around her shoulders, illustrating common flamenco costuming. The dancer's pose, with the outstretched left arm, is a depiction of standard flamenco dance technique and style.

El Jaleo is the most theatrical of Sargent's early major works. The lack of a barrier between the viewer and dancer helps create the illusion that we are present at the actual event; the manipulation of space and lighting communicates the energetic rhythms of the dance, its sound and movement.

El Jaleo is an example of Hispanism, the phenomenon of widespread fascination with Spanish culture throughout Europe and America in the nineteenth and early twentieth century.

The painting has been called both an example of John Singer Sargent's Impressionism and also his early affinity with the Realist movement.

Provenance
Sargent exhibited El Jaleo at the 1882 Paris Salon, where the painting was purchased by a Boston patron, Thomas Jefferson Coolidge. It was the last subject picture that Sargent exhibited at the Salon, and his greatest success there.

In 1888 the painting was publicly exhibited in Boston, at which time museum patron Isabella Stewart Gardner, the heiress wife of a Coolidge cousin, expressed her interest in it. In 1914 she borrowed El Jaleo to exhibit in her museum, and constructed the Spanish Cloister gallery especially for El Jaleo, which is framed by a Moorish arch and reflected the painting in a large mirror running perpendicular to its left edge. Coolidge then gave the painting to Gardner, and Sargent presented her with an album of pencil drawings he had made as preparatory sketches for the work.

El Jaleo was on exhibition at the National Gallery of Art in Washington D.C. for a short time in 1992, on loan from the Isabella Stewart Gardner Museum for the first time since 1914. At that time, the painting had been recently cleaned and restored by Alain Goldrach.

Critical reception 
After the initial exhibition of El Jaleo in 1882 at the French Salon, John Singer Sargent became, as one writer put it, "the most talked-about painter in Paris." Some critics in 1882 said that the painting caused Sargent to join the ranks of the French Impressionists. A critic for Le Figaro called the painting "one of the most original and strongest works of the present Salon." Some writers hailed the painting as clever, while others dismissed it as a vagary of the artist.

Notes

References
Chong, Alan, et al. Masterpieces from the Isabella Stewart Gardner Museum. Beacon Press, Boston, 2003. 
Fairbrother, Trevor. John Singer Sargent: The Sensualist. 1st ed. p. 102.: Yale UP, 2000. Print.
Heller, Nancy G. "What's There, What's Not." American Art 14.1 (2000): 8. 
Kilmurray, Elizabeth, Ormond, Richard. John Singer Sargent. Tate Gallery Publishing Ltd, 1999. 
Prettejohn, Elizabeth. Interpreting Sargent. Stewart, Tabori & Chang, 1998.
Simpson, Marc. Uncanny Spectacle The Public Career of the Young John Singer Sargent. N.p.: YALE UP, 1997. Print.
Sweeney, Louise. "Sargent's 'El Jaleo' Dances Anew." The Christian Science Monitor: 12. Mar 10 1992.

Further reading

1882 paintings
Paintings by John Singer Sargent
Paintings in the collection of the Isabella Stewart Gardner Museum
Dance in art
Musical instruments in art